Fire & Blood is a fantasy book by American writer George R. R. Martin and illustrated by Doug Wheatley. It tells the history of House Targaryen, the dynasty that ruled the Seven Kingdoms of Westeros in the backstory of his series A Song of Ice and Fire. Although originally planned for publication after the completion of the series, Martin has revealed his intent to publish the history in two volumes as the material had grown too large. The first volume was released on November 20, 2018.

The second half of this first volume (an expanded version of The Princess and the Queen) has been adapted into the HBO series House of the Dragon, a prequel to Game of Thrones.

Publication history
In 2014, more than 200,000 words were removed  from the manuscript of Martin's companion book The World of Ice & Fire and were incorporated into Fire & Blood.

In February 2017, Elio M. García Jr., Martin's co-author for The World of Ice & Fire, reported that he had spoken with Martin at WorldCon 75, held in 2017 in Helsinki, about the first volume of Fire & Blood. According to García, in addition to the never-published material developed for The World of Ice & Fire, Martin also created entirely new material for the book, having "worked on just fleshing out a bit" the long reign of King Jaehaerys I Targaryen, which was previously only mentioned in "Heirs of the Dragon", an unpublished text that Martin abridged in the novelette The Rogue Prince.

On July 22, 2017, Martin revealed on his blog that the material for Fire & Blood had grown so large that the decision had been made to publish the histories of the Targaryen kings in two volumes. The first volume, simply called Fire & Blood, is set to cover the history of Westeros from Aegon's Conquest up to and through the regency of the boy king, Aegon III Targaryen. While the first volume of Fire & Blood has been published, the second volume was largely unwritten as of July 2017.

In April 2018, when announcing the publication date, Martin revealed the manuscript to be 989 pages long. An excerpt was revealed in October 2018.

Contents
Rather than a novel, Fire & Blood takes the form of a scholarly treatise about the Targaryen dynasty written by a historian within the world of A Song of Ice and Fire, Archmaester Gyldayn. Gyldayn cites a variety of fictional primary sources for the historical events he describes, whose accounts sometimes conflict with each other, reflecting medieval methods of historiography and thus making Gyldayn an unreliable narrator from the reader's perspective.

The first volume of Fire & Blood contains the following texts:
 "The Targaryen Conquest": Aegon I Targaryen's conquest of the Seven Kingdoms of Westeros. Published in more or less same version in The World of Ice & Fire.
 "The Peace of the Dragon": Aegon I's reign after his Conquest. While Aegon I's reign is briefly glossed over in The World of Ice & Fire, no parts of the text have been published before.
 "The Sons of the Dragon": Focuses on the lives of Aegon I's sons, King Aenys I Targaryen and King Maegor I Targaryen, ending with Maegor's death and the ascension of Aenys's son Jaehaerys I Targaryen to the throne. An abridged version of The Sons of the Dragon was released in October 2017 titled The Sons of the Dragon in the anthology The Book of Swords.
 "Heirs of the Dragon": Being about 17,000 words long, it focuses on the reign of Jaehaerys I Targaryen and the succession crisis following the deaths of his sons. An abridged version, The Rogue Prince, previously published in the anthology Rogues in 2014, uses the majority of this text.
 "The Dying of the Dragons": Being about 60,000 words in length, it focuses on the great civil war known as the Dance of the Dragons, the Targaryen civil war between Rhaenyra Targaryen and her half-brother Aegon II for the throne. An abridged version of 30,000 words was included in The Princess and the Queen, which was published in the anthology Dangerous Women in 2013.
 "Aftermath — The Boy King and His Regents": Covering the first few years of the reign of Rhaenyra's young son Aegon III, when the realm was ruled by Aegon's regents. According to García, it is "almost as long" as The Dying of the Dragons in total word count.

Fire & Blood is illustrated in a similar fashion to A Knight of the Seven Kingdoms. The book contains more than seventy-five black and white illustrations by Doug Wheatley.

Reception
Fire & Blood received mixed reviews from critics. Hugo Rifkind of The Times described it as "interminable, self-indulgent crap." Roisin O'Connor of The Independent faulted the book for its dry tone and stated that reading it feels like "you've been assigned a mildly interesting, but often tedious, piece of homework". Publishers Weekly stated that "Martin's evocative storytelling style and gift for gripping narrative are mostly absent from this dry history".

Conversely, Dan Jones of The Sunday Times praised the book, calling it "a masterpiece of popular historical fiction". Similarly, Chris Lough of Tor.com described the book as "... the best Song of Ice and Fire book in 18 years", a comparison to A Storm of Swords.

Adaptation
The HBO series House of the Dragon, a prequel to Game of Thrones, is based on material from Fire and Blood, which covers the Dance of Dragons civil war. The show is produced by Martin, Vince Gerardis, Ryan Condal, and Miguel Sapochnik; in addition, the latter two are its showrunners.

Notes

References

2018 American novels
2018 fantasy novels
American fantasy novels
Novels by George R. R. Martin
A Song of Ice and Fire books
Novels about death
Dragons in popular culture
Incest in fiction
Novels about magic
Politics in fiction
Family saga novels
Bantam Books books